Lisio is a comune (municipality) in the Province of Cuneo in the Italian region Piedmont, located about  south of Turin and about  east of Cuneo.

Lisio borders the following municipalities: Bagnasco, Battifollo, Monasterolo Casotto, Scagnello, and Viola.

Demographic evolution

References

Cities and towns in Piedmont
Comunità Montana Valli Mongia, Cevetta e Langa Cebana